The GCR Class 2 was derived from a Kitson (Leeds) built/Thomas Parker designed prototype 4-4-0 locomotive No. 561, (the first single frame locomotive built for the MSLR) exhibited in Manchester in 1887.  The design lead to the production of a series of express steam locomotives built between 1890 and 1894 for use on the Manchester, Sheffield and Lincolnshire Railway, later the Great Central Railway. The last batch of six, built 1894, had larger bearings for the coupled wheels, coil springs (instead of leaf springs) for the driving axle and was classified 2A.

When first built, the Class 2s were used on the MSLR main express trains. They regularly hauled the Manchester to King's Cross expresses to and from Grantham. Early records suggest that they were very economical locomotives during this period.

These locomotives were superseded by the Pollitt D6 and Robinson D9 locomotives in 1895 and 1901 respectively, and were reduced to stopping and secondary services.

LNER ownership
They passed to the London and North Eastern Railway (LNER) in 1923 and both classes were re-classified D7.  During the early years of the LNER (before 1928), the D7s qualified for the LNER's green passenger locomotive livery. This led to the Immingham D7s acquiring the nickname of 'Green Bogies'  By this time, they were already obsolete - withdrawals starting in 1926 and progressed slowly, the last D7 was withdrawn in 1939 with no preserved examples.

New locomotive

A project has now been launched to build a new member of this class (No. 567) to modern engineering standards (using metric steel and specifications) for running on the Great Central Railway. It is a semi-new build locomotive being erected at Ruddington on the GCR Northern section (GCRN - Great Central Railway, Nottingham - GCRN)
www.gcrn.co.uk. The build, with a potential boiler, cylinder block and tender chassis already found, and the rest costing about £950,000. However, a review of the proposed boiler, needing some work to be usable. has led the group to actively consider a new-build boiler at a cost of little more than the repair costs (it being a round top fire box saturated steam boiler). The Bogie wheels are identical to those on the 'Brighton Atlantic Project', however the Bluebell Railway have declined to release the pattern so the group will have to make a new one - other new-build projects based on Kitson design/manufacture may also have useful parts. Design work is well advanced with over 350 drawings having already been created, studied and reviewed for manufacture.  New methodology is being considered for casting using 'Polypatterns' created by 3D printing - a considerable cost saving.

Investigations undertaken when creating the design for the new frames showed that these locomotives were structurally weak at the front end - photos show damage caused by 'heavy shunts'.  The majority of their service life, these engines would have spent coupled to their trains via the tender - for use on preserved lines, the locomotive needs to be able to run Smokebox to train.  The GCR567 design team will utilise the later Kitson & Co (1892) build for the frames - these later engines being built with slightly deeper frames but the GCR567 team still needs to address the weakness - by creating a new front Dragbox and Doubler plates (additional plates added to re-enforce weak areas of the frames and in this case to carry the Cylinder Block - the latter will seen from the outside, however this and other modern updates to improve ease of maintenance, and should not detract from the visual re-creation of this Victorian Locomotive.

See also
 Steam locomotives of the 21st century

References

4-4-0 locomotives
02
Kitson locomotives
Railway locomotives introduced in 1887
Standard gauge steam locomotives of Great Britain
Scrapped locomotives
Passenger locomotives